Events in the year 1897 in Venezuela.

Incumbents
President: Ignacio Andrade

Events
28 January – Early film screenings at the Baralt Theatre in Maracaibo, premiere of the first Venezuelan films
2 February – the Treaty of Washington between Venezuela and the United Kingdom was signed, towards the end of the Venezuelan crisis of 1895
28 July – Establishment of the Roman Catholic Archdiocese of Maracaibo

Births
4 August – José Nucete Sardi
15 September – Mario Briceño Iragorry

Deaths

References